Delphinium hutchinsoniae is a rare species of larkspur known by the common names Monterey larkspur and Hutchinson's larkspur. It is endemic to California, where it is known only from Monterey County. This wildflower reaches a meter in height but is usually shorter. The leaves are divided into lobes which are further divided into smaller lobes, and they are mostly located low on the plant. The top of the thin, erect stem is occupied by an inflorescence of not more than ten flowers. Each flower has sepals which are brilliant purple or blue to lavender, two petals which are the same color, and two upper petals which are usually white. The spur is up to two centimeters long and curves down at the tip.

References

External links
Jepson Manual Treatment
Elkhorn Slough Rare Species Profile
Photo gallery

hutchinsoniae
Endemic flora of California
Natural history of Monterey County, California